Stephen Parez (born 1 August 1994) is a French rugby sevens player. In 2013 he played in the U-20 Six Nations Championship and the IRB Junior World Championship.

Parez has also taken part in other sports such as Athletics, Taekwondo and Swimming. He competed for France at the 2022 Rugby World Cup Sevens in Cape Town.

References

External links 
 
 
 
 
 

1994 births
Living people
Male rugby sevens players
Rugby sevens players at the 2016 Summer Olympics
Olympic rugby sevens players of France
France international rugby sevens players